A sponging-house (more formally: a lock-up house)
was a place of temporary confinement for debtors in the United Kingdom. 

If a borrower defaulted on repaying a debt, a creditor could lay a complaint with the sheriff. The sheriff sent his bailiffs or tipstaffs to arrest the debtor and to take him to the local sponging-house. This was not a debtors' prison as such, but a private house, often the bailiff's own home. Debtors would be held there temporarily in the hope that they could make some arrangement with creditors. Anthony Trollope set out the system in his 1857 novel The Three Clerks:

If debtors could not sort matters out quickly, they were then taken before a court and transferred to a debtor's prison.

Sponging-houses had a terrible reputation, which was made clear in a description by Montagu Williams, a London lawyer who knew them well, in his Down East and Up West of 1892:

 
The idea of the sponging-house was based on that of the sponge that gave it its name, which readily gives up its contents on being squeezed. In the sponging-house, debtors had any available cash squeezed out of them, partly to the creditor's benefit, but also to that of the bailiff who ran it.

In French, éponger une dette ("sponge-up a debt") means to repay one's debt. Scottish English has the verb "to spung", meaning to rob. The English-language term "spunging-house" dates from at least 1699.

Notable sponging-house residents
William Paget (actor)
Henry Fielding – author
Michael Arne – composer
Theodore Edward Hook – author
George Morland – painter
John Murray – Universalist minister 
 Gilbert Stuart – painter

See also
Marshalsea

References 

Debtors' prisons
Penal system in England